Glycosmis monticola is a species of plant in the family Rutaceae. It is endemic to Peninsular Malaysia. It is threatened by habitat loss.

References

monticola
Endemic flora of Peninsular Malaysia
Endangered plants
Taxonomy articles created by Polbot